József Andrusch (born 31 March 1956) is a retired Hungarian football player.

Personal life
Andrusch is the oldest of four boys. Between the age of 5 and 6 his father replaced the door of the house and used the old door boards to make a kid size goal for Andrusch and his friends play in where Andrusch was the goalie. Andrusch played as a footballer both during his time in the university and the Hungarian army.

International career
Andrusch played in 3 world cup qualifying matches for the 1986 FIFA World Cup.

Post-retirement
In 2016 Andrusch became a goalkeeper trainer with his former team Vasas SC. He was previously the goalkeeper trainer for the Hungary national football team.

Honours
Hungarian League: 1984, 1985, 1986 
Hungarian Cup: 1985

References

External links 
 
 
 
 NB 1
 Courtney Barrie. 1984 Matches
 Champions' Cup 1985–1986 -Second Round- 2nd Leg at RomanianSoccer.ro
 Budapest Honvéd at WorldFootball.net

1956 births
Living people
Hungarian people of German descent
Footballers from Budapest
Hungarian footballers
Association football goalkeepers
Hungary international footballers
Volán FC players
Budapest Honvéd FC players
Vasas SC players
1986 FIFA World Cup players